Shifuguangchang is a station on Line 2 of the Shenyang Metro. The station opened on 30 December 2011.

Station Layout

References 

Railway stations in China opened in 2011
Shenyang Metro stations